"Push It to the Limit" is a pop/R&B song performed by Corbin Bleu.

Marketing
Made to cross-promote the Disney film Jump In! (released January 12, 2007), "Push It to the Limit"  was released on the Disney Channel on Thanksgiving Day 2006, and on Radio Disney the following Saturday.  According to a press release from Walt Disney Records, this single and the other songs on the album are:...part of the new music genre dubbed "pop-hop" for its blend of pop and hip-hop music styles [...] "Push It to the Limit," the lead track from the Jump In! album, also will be featured on Corbin Bleu's debut album Another Side, available on Hollywood Records April 17, 2007.
According to an analysis by the Knoxville News Sentinel: ...using a multi-media approach to corner the youth market [...] Disney keeps rolling with the soundtrack for "Jump In!" [...] The urban/pop album is a methodical appeal to the targeted market, but not so formulaic that it fails. In fact, there's enough of an edge to most of these tracks that parents and older siblings won't be put off—at least not initially—if they're exposed to the soundtrack. [...] Hip-hop meets electronic dance music while choruses brand the refrains with heavy repetition, and happily there's not much namby-pamby filler that inevitably seems to bog down music for this demographic.  Bleu confidently punches his way through "Push It to the Limit"...

Corbin Bleu himself, in describing the sound of the music he is making with the Disney Company, relates it to other very popular youth-oriented pop rap acts:It’s kind of R&B mixed with pop. You can think very similar to Justin Timberlake style with an Usher or Chris Brown type of thing going on as well.
 
The Los Angeles Times, in naming Bleu one of the "Faces to Watch" in 2007, remarked upon:a new brand of teen-pop for Disney – a wholesome, natural, R&B-flavored reaction to the synthetic era of Britney and the Backstreet Boys.  With his ebullient-urchin image driven by the tireless Disney promotional machine that's taken the Cheetah Girls, "High School Musical" and "Hannah Montana" to the top of the charts, Bleu is poised to be the face of youth-pop in 2007.

Like Bleu's last Disney project High School Musical (which New York Daily News has called "the biggest pop cultural phenomenon of 2006"), Jump In! will be promoted with a concert tour.  Comparing his new prominence with this previous situation, Corbin Bleu remarked:I don't have any solos in 'High School Musical.' The only time you actually hear my voice is on 'Stick to the Status Quo,' where you can hear me say the word 'What?' But at least I got a dance solo.
"Push It to the Limit" (the song and video), along with the movie and album it vanguards, mark a major increase in Bleu's career and role in Disney's entertainment empire.

Music video
The music video shows Bleu and four other young males dancing in a high school gym. It also shows Bleu with his afro pulled back in a ponytail on bleachers with a group of girls. Clips from the movie, Jump In! are shown as well. Since its release, the video has been played on the Disney Channel frequently. A dance to the limit, or dance-along version was shown in portions during a Jump In! airing on March 16, 2007.

The video also features Johnny "J Blaze" Erasme from the JammXKids as one of the dancers.

There is also a version without the Jump In! scenes. So, the dance scenes are extended. Because the Jump in! scenes are cut from this version, some dance scenes have to be moved up from their regular position in the version with the Jump In! scenes. Thus some dances are repeated and new ones are added.

Chart performance
In late January 2007, the song debuted on the Billboard Hot 100 at number 14 and on the Hot Digital Songs chart at number 5, with 77,000 downloads. It peaked at number 87 on the UK Singles Chart, staying on the Top 200 chart for eight weeks.

Charts

Notes

2006 songs
2006 debut singles
Corbin Bleu songs
Songs written by Matthew Gerrard
Songs written by Robbie Nevil
Song recordings produced by Robbie Nevil
Hollywood Records singles
Song recordings produced by Matthew Gerrard